A baïne is a pool of water of a few dozen to several hundreds of metres length parallel to the beach, and directly connected to the sea. These are spaced every 300 to 400 metres and formed under the influence of waves and the tide. The name baïne is typical for the Aquitaine coast of France found in the departements of Gironde, Charente-Maritime and Landes, but it occurs on beaches all around the world.

When a wave hits the coast it can pass over the sandbar that separates the baïne from the sea and enter it all along its length. When the wave subsequently recedes, this water returns to sea through the single point where the baïne is connected to the sea. At this point a rip current, a very strong offshore current, can therefore occur. The current will vary depending on the height of the waves and the height of the tide. It is at its strongest and most dangerous, during the final hours approaching low tide and the first hours afterwards. Swimmers caught in this current are recommended not to resist, but to let themselves be ported out to sea where the current is weaker, and then to swim parallel to the beach before returning to land.

Development of a baïne 

Baïnes appear where the phenomenon of tide is strong, the sand fine, the beach flat with a strong swell. The swell moves the sand along the shore, interfering with current perpendicular to the beach. These currents prevail seaward the sandy bottom and digging pits visible at low tide of up to 100 meters wide and 4-5 meters deep. Each baïne has its own morphology and generates various forms of currents.

References

Coastal and oceanic landforms